The Banaadiri people are a nationality in Somalia. Banaadiris largely inhabit Somalia's southern coastline.

Overview

Although the Benadiri are sometimes described as the founders of Mogadishu (hence, their colloquial name Reer Xamar or "People of Mogadishu", though the city itself is postulated to be a successor of ancient Sarapion), the Benadiris originate from a group of Arab travelers who settled along the southern coast of Somalia and built stone towns for defense and trade.

Their members also trace their origins to diverse groups. The latter include Arab, Persian and Somali people.

Reer Xamar were instrumental in helping to consolidate the local Muslim community, especially in the coastal Benadir region. During the colonial period, they were also among the founding members of the Somali Youth League, Somalia's first political party.

Benadiri Confederates

The Benadiri people split up into three major confederacies, named after the towns in which its based in. Each of these confederacy is made up of clans that can also be found in other town umbrella's in the example of Asharaf, Haatim, Reer Faqi and Shanshiyo these clans can be found among all 3 groups (Shanshiyo and Reer Faqi are part of the Biido confederacy in Baraawe)

Reer Xamar 
 The Reer Xamar
 Abakaaro (Haatim sub clan)
 Abdi Samad
 Ali Mohamed
 'Amuudi
 Asharaf
 Askarey
 Aydarussi
 Bandhaboow (a confederacy of 7 clans)
Amin Khalaafow
Bahar Suufi
Oontiro
Sheybo
Quruwaaye
Ahmed Nur
Ali iyo Mohamed
 Ba Fadal
 Ba Hamish
 Ba Sadiq
 Ba Mukhtar
 Dhabarweyn (3 clan confederacy)
Wabaas (3 clan confederacy)
Reer Aw Bakar
Reer Misgal
Reer Makaran
Mohamed Jibril
Haaji Qarar
 Gudmane
 Indho Weyne (4 clan confederacy)
Reer Rooblow
Reer Cali Musa
Mussa Haaji
Aw Mumin Hassan
 Moorsho Mariid
 Qalmashube(3 clan confederacy)
Haji Ibrahim
Haji Abdi
Baaqashwa
 Reer Faqi
 Reer Haaji
 Reer Shiikh
 Reer Shaykh Muminow
 Saddeh' Geedi
Aadan Dheere
Reer Cabdulle
Reer 'Awaale
 Shanshiyo
 Shaamsi

Reer Marka 

The Reer Marka group are also known as locally and politically as 12 koofi iyo mashayikh (Somali: 12 caps and 3 Sheikhs); there are currently 15 clans in the traditional elder council. With the clan group Reer Maanyo being considered one despite they themselves being a confederation of 4 different clans in the city of Marka.
 The Reer Marka
Gaameedle
 Ahmed Nuur
 Duruqbo
 Asharaaf
 Reer Khadiib
 Fasahaale (More commonly known as Kafaari)
 Garjanti
Haatim
 Juunji
 Reer Manyo
Reer Macow (also known as Ba Muqtar)
 Reer Shaawis
 Reer Omar
 Reer 'Aafi
 Reer Haaji
 Reer Hassan
 Shiikhaal Jaziira
 Shiikhaal Gendershe
Shanshiyo
 Shukureere
Qalmashube

Reer Baraawe 
 The Reer Baraawe
Biido
 Ra Waali
 Ra Ma'limu
 Gabro
 Ra Mashaanga
 Reer Faqi
Ra Shaqali (Ra Baqtiile, Ra Duressa)
 Cabdi Shuqaale 
 Ra Bakari (Ra Nurshe, Ra Raabe, Ra Banawari)
 Ba Sadiq
 Raa Mkaawu
 Zimarka
Ra Mgumi
Haatim
Asharaf

Distribution 

The Benadiri people are primarily and traditionally based on the southern coastal towns of Mogadishu, Marka and Baraawe where Reer Hamar, Reer Marka (12 koofi) and Reer Baraawe confederacies are traditionally based. They can also be found in Warsheikh and other coastal towns between Mogadishu and Baraawe such as Jaziira, Abaay Dhahaan, Dhaanane, Jilib Marka, Gendershe, Munghiya and further south in the town of Kismayo. Off the coast Benadiri people are also found in towns such as Afgooye, Genale, Bulo Burto, Mahadei Weyne, Balcad, Jowhar, Beled Weyne, Diinsor, Bur Hakaba, Baidoa, Bardheere, Buale, Jilib, Jamaame and villages surrounding these towns.

In Mogadishu the Benadiri people are primarily found in the 2 oldest districts of the city: Hamar Weyne and Shingani. However they also have a large presences in adjacent districts to the ancient districts of Mogadishu such as 'Abdiaziz, Shibis, Boondheere, Hamar Jajab, Waaberi and Madina. With the Benadiri presences in these districts being made of both the native reer Xamars and other Benadiri people who had moved to the city after the expansion that came with it being made the capital of Somalia.

Much like Mogadishu the Benadiri people in Merca are primarily based in the oldest part of the city, Saraha and Aw Balle. Much like Mogadishu the Benadiri clans in Merca also have a huge presence in the newer parts of the towns such as Ruusiya, Beytuuras, 'El Bashiirow and Buulo Jaan. Majority of the benadiri in the town are from member clans of the 12 Koofi confederacy however Bravenese and Reer Hamar people can be found here in Merca, the latter primarily moving to the city after the civil war

In Baraawe, the Bravenese people primarily live in the two oldest towns of Mpayi and Biruune. They also have a presence in Al Bamba, Baghdaadi and Bulo Baazi where they live with groups who are more recent to the town. These towns later on had their names changed by the Siad Barre government, where Biruune and Al Bamba are now Dayax (Somali: Moon), Mpaayi has been renamed Wadajir (Somali: United) and Baghdaad being renamed Howlwadaag (Somali: Communism). These name changes under the nationalist socialist regime mainly came about to deny the peculiarities of the history of that city compared to other cities in Somalia.  

In the hinterlands of the coast these groups from Mogadishu, Merca and Baraawe are primarily found in trading hubs such as; Afgooye, Bur Hakaba, Baidoa, Wanlaweyne, Jowhar, Diinsoor, Bardheere and Luuq. Many of these communities were established in these places due to trade with the local clans living there or in a lot of the cases being part of a sufi Jama'ah being found in these towns and their surroundings. In the case of Reer Shaykh Muminoow clan from Hamar Weyne district clan founder is buried in Bur Hakaba and is a sufi saint for the Rahanweyne local clans in Bur Hakaba, Baidoa and as far as Luuq where they do siyaaro at his grave yearly along with descendants of his from both the hinterlands and the coast.

Languages 
The Benadiri community speak are not homogenous a homogenous group in regards to the languages they speak. As the language they speak is usually dictated by the region they hail from than anything.

The 12 Koofi speak a dialect of Somali colloquially referred to as Mahdoonte (Somali: Mahaa rabta, English: What do you want) or as some linguists have named Aff Asharaf and in some communities in Mogadishu. Especially in the historic Shingani district. This dialect according to Benadiri elders is very similar to the Af-Reer Xamar dialect spoken in the Hamar Weyne district and it surrounding districts. As there was a 3-4% difference in the dialects according to some of the elders.

The Bravanese speak the Bravanese language (Chimwiini or Chimini), Northern Dialect of Swahili. Chi- is a prefix denoting "language", and Miini (Mwiini) is the alternative name of Barawa, the Bravanese people themselves would never call the town as Barawa or Brava, but rather as Miini. Chimini is a standard version of the original Bravanese language which is called Chambalazi, the standard Chimini language contains and Arabic. Chambalazi contains some of the oldest Swahili words and dialects, it started to evolve through time and intermixing of other ethnicity and languages. The Barawa language is over 1000 years old, and still spoken today by approximately 30,000 Bravanese, this is due to the preservation of the language by the early scholars in Barawa. Sheikh Qassim al Barawi was the first Bravanese Scholar to start writing standard Chimini, it was written in Persian and Arabic. Throughout history, the language was used to spread Islam in the Swahili Coast, this was done via poetry and Religious books or manuscripts.

Festivals

Istaqfuurow 
Istaqfurow or Istaqfurlow derives form the Arabic word Astaqfuru (Arabic: أَسْتَغْفِرُ) which translates to "seeking forgiveness". Istighfar, seeking forgiveness from Allah is a common practice of Muslims all around the world and you'll hear in everyday conversation between Muslims. Istaqfuro is an annual Benadiri event held in the Hamar Weyne district of Mogadishu when there is high winds and high tides. The festive goers chant "Astaqfuru Rabukum, Innahu Kaana Qaffuura Yursilo Samaa calaykum Mitraaran" a passage from the Quran Surat Nur verse 10 which translates as "Ask Allah forgiveness, for He is forgiving He will send rain from the sky" (Arabic: فَقُلْتُ اسْتَغْفِرُوا رَبَّكُمْ إِنَّهُ كَانَ غَفَّارًا). During this Festival, animals are slaughtered and prayers are said, in search of God‟s forgiveness for transgressions, to ask for the calming of the winds so that ships can sail, and for the rains to come. Despite the locals treating this festival as a festival with Islamic, many believe this festival is a pre-Islamic festival where locals on the coast of southern Somalia. As the festival is a reaction to a natural phenomenon of a particular season, which is linked to the solar calendar and not the lunar which Muslims follow.

Shirka 

The Shirka is a festival that happens annually in the Hamar Weyne district of Mogadishu. This festival is most generally known as dabshiid which translate to lighting of the fire in Somali (Neyrus in Persian), this festival occurs in Mogadishu at the same time as the Istunka in Afgooye, and is so similar as to be the same. The men gather in groups by lineage, and wear different coloured shirts with matching headbands to identify their clan affiliations, they also carry long sticks that they thrust up and down in rhythm as they chant and shuffle through the designated route of the neighbourhoods of Hamar Weyne. At the start of the shir festivities, the Reer Faqi elders, in keeping with their position of neutrality in the community, are called upon to bless the occasion. The festival starts and ends at Jama'a Xamar Weyne, Xamar Weyne near the Moorsho neighbourhood.

Notable Figures

Religious leaders 

 ʿAbd al-ʿAzīz alAmawī, was a scholar following the Shāfi‘ī school of jurisprudence and was also adviser to several sultans of Zanzibar
Sheikh Abubakar Sheikh Muhiyiddiin, senior Qadi of Mogadishu like his father Sheikh Muhiyidin Moalim Mukarram and high-ranking cleric for twenty years. He is the one who supplied rare and precious documents to Cerulli which enabled him (Cerulli) to reconstruct the history of the Arabs in the Benadir. A primary document of which was the Book of the Zeng, but the antique documents came from the archives of the grandfather, Moalim Mukarram, who died 1850
Al-sheikh Mohammad Yahya Ala'deen bin Moallim Mukaram, senior Qadi in Mogadihsu and the teacher of Sheikh Abba from whom he learned the book Matin Abi Shuja
Shaykh Abi-Bakar Bin Mihdaar, buried in Warsheekh about 70 km from Mogadishu. Pre civil war he's gravesight was a place of pilgrimage for sufi adherents but in November 2010. Was the teacher of ulema such as Abd al-Raḥman bin Aḥmad al-Zaylaʽi and many more. 
Aw Osman Hassan, also known as Aw Usmaan Marki. Synonymous with the Benadiri town of Merca where there's saying "Merca 'Aday Mininka Aw Osman", which translates to as "White Merca House of Aw Osman" He is venerated in not only Marka but all over Lower Shabelle, there is a mosque named after him in the beginning of the city when coming from the former port where annual ziyaaros happen for Aw Usmaan. It is said that the Shaykh had died in the year 1560.
Aw Faqi Aboor, Faqih Shaykh Ahmed bin Faqih Abubakar bin Faqih Abhajj more commonly known as Aw Faqi Aboor. Is the most celebrated ancestor of the Reer Faqi's where an annual ziyaaro is done for him for 15 days annually where quran is read along with traditional practices. He's graveyard is to the west of Boondheere not too far from Villa Somalia.
Shaykh Mohammad Ba Hassan,The ancestor of the notorious Shiikhaal Jasiira clan and the master of ‘Ilm al-Asraar (“secret knowledge”), whose shrine is visited even today in Jazira a town, south of Mogadishu.
Shaykh Ahmed Haaji Malaaq, Religious reformer and opponent of Italian colonial conquest. Unlike his counterparts, who usually preached in masjid that were locally based or identified with a tariqa (order), Sheikh Mohhadi lectured in masjid in diverse quarters of Mogadishu, such as the Jamaa Xamar Weyne’, Fakhruddin, Arba’ Rukun, and Shingani masjid. He was well known for his anti colonial stance expressed in his khutbah (Friday sermons). In 1889, he condemned the Italo-Zanzibar treaties, which handed over the Banadir ports, including Mogadishu, and the inland territory to the Italians as colonial possessions. To show his holy defiance, he abandoned Mogadishu, darul kufr (the place of the infidels), in what he called a hijra (thus, replicating the Prophet's Hijra to Medina) to Nimow, about 15 kilometers north of Jazira on the coast, which he proclaimed darul Islam). There he established the Jama’adda Nimow (the Nimow Brotherhood). Buried at Warabaale on the way to Afgooye, about 16 km from Mogadishu
Shaykh Mahad Nur Diinlow, the teacher of Sheikh Sufi and father of Shaykh Ahmad bin Hajji Mahad Al Muqdishi, who was mentioned in the biography of Shaykh Uways al-Barawi mentioning him as being one of the most prominent Qadirriys Khulfa
Shaykh Mohamud Hassan, the ancestor of the Reer Ma'ow (Ba Muqtar) clan of the Reer Maanyo confederacy and annual festival is held for him.
 Shaykh Sufi, Abd Al-Rahman bin Abdullah al Shashi (Arabic: عبد الرحمن بن عبد الله الشاشي) (b. 1829 - 1904), popularly known as Sheikh Sufi, was a 19th-century Somali scholar, poet, reformist and astrologist. An annual festival is held for him in the Koodka neighbourhood of Hamar Weyne.
 Sheikh Abba, for the latter part of the twentieth century Sheikh Mahamed Sheikh Ahmed Sheikh Mahamud al-Shashy, popularly known as Sheikh Abba, was a leading member of the Mogadisho 'ulama, a follower of the Qadiriyya tariqa and a foremost sheikh of Hamar Weyne.
 Muḥyī al-Dīn al-Qaḥṭānī al-Wāʾilī (c. 1790–1869) was a Bravanese who became chief Shāfiʿī qāḍī of Zanzibar. He was the author of poems in Arabic and Swahili and other works, including one on tawḥīd and a commentary on al-Nawawīʾs Minḥāj al-Ṭālibīn.
 Sheikh Nureini Ahmed Sabiri Al Hatimi, (died December 1909), a member of the Hatimi group of Brava, was an influential ʿālim who served as qāḍī during the reign of Sultan Barghash of Zanzibar and during the very first period of Italian colonial rule. A specialist in fiqh, Sheikh Nureni also composed qaṣāʾid in Arabic. Under the influence of his teacher Shaykh Maḥmūd Waʿays he became a follower of the Aḥmadiyyah. He had close relations of friendship with Sheikh Uways and Dada Masiti, both affiliated with the Qādiriyyah, and became the teacher of Mallim Nuri.
 Dada Masiti, Mana Sitti Habib Jamaladdin (Arabic: مانا ستي حبيب جمال الدين) (c. 1810s – 15 July 1919), commonly known as Dada Masiti ("Grandmother Masiti"), was an Ashraf poet, mystic and Islamic scholar. She composed her poetry in the Bravanese dialect spoken in Barawa.
 Uways Al Barawi, Sheikh Uways b. Mohamed b. Mahadh al-Qādirī (c. 1847–1909) was the foremost sheikh of the Qādiriyyah in Somalia and teacher of Sheikh Qasim
 Sheikh Qasim Muhyiddin Maie Omar, widely known as Qāsim b. Muḥyī al-Dīn al-Barāwī (1882–1922) was a Bravanese ʿālim. After studying with the Qādirī sheikhs Uways and ʿAbd al-Raḥmān b. ʿAbdallah al-Shāshī (“Sheikh Sufi”), he became a prominent member and propagator of the Qādiriyyah. An accomplished Arabist, he left an impressive production of religious poems in Arabic and in Chimiini. Some of the latter compositions are translations of Arabic texts.
Shaykh Ahmed Muhiyyidin, was the teacher of Shaykh Sufi from who he received his ijaza on the qaddiriyah tariqa from.
Sheikh Mahamuud Sh.Abdulrahman Sh. Ahmed, the paternal grandfather of Sheikh Abba and early teacher of the Sheikh.
Sheikh Abdul Majeed Sheikh Mohammad Sheikh Sufi, the grandson of Sheikh Sufi and the teacher/mentor of Sheikh Abba after the death of his grandfather. Taught out of the Awooto Eeday mosque in Xamar Weyne district of Mogadishu. 
 Shaykh Ali Maye, a revered Sufi saint of the Duruqbo clan, a yearly festival is held for him outside his shrine in Marka and it ends on the 5 of the islamic month of Safar.
Shaykh Mohamed Shaykh Ali Maye, son of the revered Sufi saint Shaykh Ali Maye buried in Boondhere, Mogadishu
 Sharif 'Aydarus, a famous scholar of Islamic and Somali history and pan-Islamic leader.Sheikh qulatayn bin mudhir al nadhiri
From Barawe

Politics 
Bur’i Mohamed Hamza, was a Somali-Canadian politician. From August 2012 to January 2014, he was a Member of the Federal Parliament of Somalia. He later served as the State Minister of Foreign Affairs and International Cooperation of Somalia from January to October 2014, and subsequently as the State Minister of Finance until December 2014. He was the State Minister of the Premier's Office for Environment at the time of his death.
Haji Mohamed Hussien, popular pan-Somalist, founder of the Greater Somali League (GSL) in 1958, one of the 13 founders of the Somali Youth Club in 1943 
Jeylani Nur Ikar
Abdirashid Mohamed Ahmed, current Petroleum minister of the Federal Government of Somalia and former minister of Commerce and industry.
 Mohamed Ahmed Raajis, political representative of the Benadiris in the reconciliation conferences during the 90s and the early 2000s. Died in Nairobi, Kenya was head of the SNU party before his death

Sports 
 Ramla Ali, current African Featherweight Champion and the first boxer in history to have won a boxing title whilst representing Somalia.
 Muhidin Abubakar, currently ranked as the number one amateur flyweight MMA fighter in the UK and Ireland.

Film 
 Abdulkadir Ahmed Said, is a prominent Somali film director, producer, screenwriter, cinematographer and editor

Art 
 Amin Amir (Somali: Amiin Caamir, Arabic: أمين أمير) is a Somali-Canadian cartoonist and painter
 Omar Nor Basharah (Somali: Cumar Nuur Baasharax, Arabic:  عمرنور باشرح ) is a Somali songer

See also
Benadir
Bravanese
12 Koofi

References

Further reading

Ethnic groups in Somalia
Muslim communities in Africa